West Virginia Route 123 is an east–west state highway located in the Bluefield, West Virginia area. The western terminus of the route is at the Virginia state line northwest of Bluefield, where WV 123 continues west as secondary State Route 643. The eastern terminus is at U.S. Route 19 and U.S. Route 460 northeast of Bluefield.

Major intersections

References

123
Transportation in Mercer County, West Virginia